Palapye Airport  is an airstrip serving Palapye, a city in the Central District of Botswana. The runway is on the southeast side of the town.

See also

Transport in Botswana
List of airports in Botswana

References

External links
OpenStreetMap - Palapye
OurAirports - Palapye
Fallingrain - Palapye Airport

Airports in Botswana